Papallacta frog may refer to:

 Papallacta robber frog, a frog endemic to Ecuador
 Papallacta tree frog, a frog found in Colombia and Ecuador

Animal common name disambiguation pages